The 2013 Emirates Melbourne Cup was the 153rd running of the Melbourne Cup, Australia's most prestigious Thoroughbred horse race. The race, held on 5 November 2013, at Flemington Racecourse in Melbourne, Victoria, was won by Fiorente. The horse, owned by Andrew Roberts and Barry Pang, was bred in Ireland, trained in Australia by Gai Waterhouse, and ridden by jockey Damien Oliver. It was Oliver's third victory in the event, after previous wins in 1995 and 2002, and his first start after a ten-month ban for a betting offence. Waterhouse, the daughter of Tommy J. Smith, who trained winners in 1955 and 1981, became the first Australian woman to train a winner.

The race was attended by 104,169 people—the Victoria Racing Club (VRC) had capped attendance at 110,000 for the Melbourne Cup and the Victoria Derby, but this mark was not reached at either race. Approximately A$90.6 million was wagered on the race through Totalisator Agency Boards in Victoria and New South Wales, with another $37.5 million wagered through equivalent agencies in Queensland, South Australia, and Tasmania.

Field
The field for the 2013 Melbourne Cup consisted of 24 horses, with the barrier draw conducted three days prior to the race, on the day of the running of the Victoria Derby. Pre-race favourite Fiorente won the race by three-quarters of a length over Red Cadeaux who finished  lengths ahead of Mount Athos. He was the first favourite to win the race since Makybe Diva in 2005, and the first horse since Empire Rose in 1988 to win the race after placing second the previous year. Tres Blue and Dunaden, the winner of the 2011 race, both received banned medical treatment on the day of the race, but were both allowed to start, although a stewards' enquiry is planned.

Except where otherwise listed, horses are trained in Australia:

Fatalities
After the race, the mare Verema was euthanised, having broken her cannon bone midway through the race.

See also
 List of Melbourne Cup winners

References

2013
Melbourne Cup
Melbourne Cup
2010s in Melbourne
November 2013 sports events in Australia